Vincent Chase is a fictional character on the comedy-drama television series Entourage. He is played by Adrian Grenier.

Character biography
Vincent Chase grew up in Queens, New York, along with neighbourhood friends Eric, Turtle, Dom, and Cara. Vince's father was an alcoholic, and, as revealed in the final season, is estranged from the family. Eric mentioned in a Season 1 episode that Vince went to the High School of Performing Arts in New York City (now the Fiorello H. LaGuardia High School of Music & Art and Performing Arts). Vince's older brother, Johnny "Drama" Chase, is also an actor and has been living in Hollywood for at least twelve years, but with considerably less success. Chase's personal life has been an area of great speculation as he has claimed to have slept with over 1,000 women, but later denied that the number is that high. Vincent is lactose intolerant.

Throughout the series, Vince talks about how he and his entourage are "living the life" after growing up with little money, at one point saying, "I came from nothing, and as much as I like the toys, I really don't need them" when told that offers for him are drying up. He is eager to share the financial and social spoils of his current stardom with them, who he thinks of as his family. While at first glance it seems that his friends are just leeches, they prove to be the ones he can depend on through thick and thin.

Vince is around 33 years old by the end of the series, his 28th birthday being the main storyline in the season 3 episode "Less Than 30". Vince's full ethnic background has never been revealed. It is implied that he has Latino ancestry when Eric argues that Vince should get the role of Pablo Escobar over actor Tom Cruise because "Tom Cruise isn't even Hispanic"; Johnny Drama also references his (and presumably Vince's) "Chilean blood" in the episode "The Sundance Kids." Vince claims to be part Japanese, after his agent, Ari Gold, made a racial slur referring to Japanese people. Vince replies, "C'mon Ari, my grandfather is Japanese." Vince has also stated that he is Italian during an interview for Vanity Fair. Vince and Drama are also part Irish, as revealed in the episode "I Love You Too."

Fictional career

Early career
Vincent Chase is a young Hollywood movie star described as potentially the best young actor of his generation. Chase moved to Los Angeles following his half-brother Johnny Chase with friend Sal "Turtle" when the two were 24. He started his career appearing in commercials for Mentos, soon signing with agent Ari Gold who got him doing minor roles on television and cinema, the first of which was a guest spot on JAG. During this time, he dated and proposed to Mandy Moore, who rejected his proposal. Soon after his best friend Eric Murphy quit his job at Sbarro, dropped out of Queensborough Community College and moved out west. Chase's breakout role was as the lead in the film Head On, co-starring Jessica Alba. After Head On, he was offered a role in the action film Matterhorn, but he passed. (Colin Farrell ends up getting offered the role, but Matterhorn never makes it to production). Instead, Vince chooses to star in the independent film Queens Boulevard, based on the advice of his manager and best friend "E". The film is about a man presumably running from the law in Queens, New York, and was directed by filmmaker Billy Walsh. Queens Boulevard (or Q.B.) was submitted to the Sundance Film Festival upon completion and wins the Grand Jury Award.

Superstardom
Because of his performance in Q.B., Vince is offered the title role in the film Aquaman, which was to be directed by James Cameron. The movie becomes a massive success, making $116 million in ticket sales on its opening weekend, breaking the record set by Spider-Man.

After the success of Aquaman, Vince was offered the role of Pablo Escobar in the bio-pic Medellín, a film that he discovered and wanted to do before Aquaman, and which was set to be directed by Crash director Paul Haggis. But conflict arose when a sequel to Aquaman was greenlit with the same start date as Medellín. Medellín was the film Vince wanted to do, and he did attempt to work out a deal to do both movies at once. However, the head of Warner Bros. Studios reneged on an earlier promise to allow Vince to do Medellín. Vince was subsequently replaced by Jake Gyllenhaal for the Aquaman sequel (mirroring the rumors in real-life as to how Gyllenhaal nearly replaced Tobey Maguire in Spider-Man 2). During his trouble of getting out of his Aquaman contract, Vince found out that he had already lost his role in Medellín to Benicio del Toro, leaving him jobless.

Eric Murphy then found a new project for Vince in a film entitled I Wanna Be Sedated, a biopic about punk-rocker Joey Ramone and his band The Ramones. But after turmoil with the film's producer Bob Ryan and with Vince's agent Ari Gold, the project was sold to Warner Bros., which refused to offer Vince another film for the rest of his career. This led to Vince firing Ari.

His new agent Amanda Daniels found him a new project entitled The Glimpses of the Moon, an adaptation of the Edith Wharton novel, to be directed by Sam Mendes. But Vince soon found out it might still be possible to get Medellín from his former agent Ari. In hopes of getting his dream project, Vince consequently began procrastinating on Glimpses. Vince also begins a brief romantic relationship with Amanda, after she boldly propositions him for sex, so they can "get it out of the way" - since sexual tension existed between the two ever since they began their agent-client relationship.

Fall from fame
After officially receiving an offer for Medellín at the very last minute, complications arose during the negotiations, which were taking place during the holiday of Yom Kippur. The film was dumped by the producer as a result. Feeling Amanda had let him down through this, Vince confronts her about it and plans on firing her, only to find out that the death of the project had been out of her hands. Amanda then leaves Vince, both professionally and romantically. Vince then purchases the script, Medellín, but only after selling his home. Once the script was purchased, negotiations were held with film producer Nick "Nicky" Rubenstein, to finance the project for $30 million. Vince turned to Billy Walsh as the director for the film. (At the time, Walsh was directing pornographic films under the alias "Wally Balls".)

During the production of Medellin, a documentary was filmed showing the process and conflict that "E", Vince and Walsh go through to complete the project. Walsh decides at the beginning of filming that the film's ending is no good, and wants to rewrite the end on his own, much to "E's' dismay. The film does get completed and for now, all is good.

After the Medellín project was completed, Walsh submitted it to the Cannes Film Festival, where it was accepted. Someone then leaked a trailer of Medellín onto YouTube, and people began to rave over the film. Hype began to build so greatly that Vince and Walsh were offered the film adaptation of the novel Lost in the Clouds.

Pre-production on the film Lost in the Clouds began, with Vince slated to star and Walsh to write/direct. But when Walsh wasn't able to adapt the novel, he began work on a script called Silo, a post-apocalypse film set in the year 2075. After Ari somehow manages to sell the studio on the new project, Lost in the Clouds was dumped and pre-production on Silo began. In the meantime, while Walsh was busy writing the script for Silo, Vincent gained an office in his manager's management group, known as The Murphy Group.

When the Cannes Film Festival finally came around, hype for Medellín had grown so large that, upon arrival, Vince and Walsh were receiving multi-million-dollar offers for the film before it even premiered. The highest bidder was Yair Marx, who offered $75 million. Once the movie was finally screened, however, the reception in the theatre was overwhelmingly negative. Marx withdrew his offer, but Harvey Weingard offered to buy it for one dollar. Opting to look at what little bright side there was to things, Ari told Vince, "You should have seen Shakespeare in Love before Harvey got his scissor-hands on it."

Medellín directly goes to DVD and is savagely reviewed by Richard Roeper and Michael Phillips. Vince also goes on to receive a Razzie nomination for "Worst Actor". The failure also apparently lead to Silo being scrapped, and Vincent and Turtle decide to decompress in a tropical hideaway, surrounded by multiple gorgeous women. After a few months pass, Ari is informed by producer Carl Ertz that he wants Vince for his next film, Danger Beach, a mid-budget genre film. Eric informs Vince of the good news, but Vince is content to go out on Medellín. Eric, Ari, and Drama fly to Mexico to get Vince to come back to L.A. for a meeting with Ertz. However, Ertz never really wanted Vince for the film to begin with. The meeting was just a ploy to get Emile Hirsch and his agent, Ari's rival Adam Davies, to do the film for less money. Despite the fact that the offer wasn't real, Vince decides that he can't go out on a box office bomb, and needs to find a new hit film to regain his stardom.

Regaining star power
After Vince discovers that there are no studios willing to offer him any leading roles, Eric discovers a good script for Vince from his newest clients, unknown writers Nick and L.B., called Nine Brave Souls. It is about nine firefighters on the night before the biggest fire they've ever fought. Ari does not want Vince to do another independent film because his last indie, Medellín, tanked. Figuring Vince was not going to star in Nick and L.B.'s film, Eric brings the script to Amanda. Amanda likes the script and sends it to her client Edward Norton. Edward Norton wants to make the film, but with more action sequences. However, after Ari finally reads the script, he wants Vince to do the movie. Vince and Ari try to sell the script, newly titled Smoke Jumpers, to studios with Vince playing the lead role. The studios wanted the script, but not with Vince in the leading role. After realizing he wasn't going to be cast as the lead, Vincent decides to play a supporting role. Ari is set to sell the script to Steve Parles for $500,000 with Vince cast as Ray in the second lead role.

Unfortunately for Vince, Edward Norton wants to buy the script along with Alan Gray, head of Warner Bros. Studios, for $1,000,000 against $2,000,000 if the movie is made. Vince loses his supporting role because Warner Bros. purchases the film. Vince now has a difficult career move to make. He can hold out for a movie he likes, and risk going bankrupt, or he can do a new Benji film for $3,000,000. Thinking it will hurt his chances to regain his status as a movie star, Vince chooses to forgo Benji. He decides he must find a way to get back on Smoke Jumpers.

Ari takes matters into his own hands to try to get Vince back on Smoke Jumpers. Ari plans a seemingly harmless day of golf with Alan Gray. Ari knows Alan is a compulsive gambler so intends to hustle Alan, and bet Vince into the movie. However, his plan backfires because Alan's golf instructor is none other than Phil Mickelson. After Ari loses a close game to Alan, Alan becomes enraged because Ari brought up the subject of Vince and Smoke Jumpers after promising he wouldn't. Alan becomes so angry that he has a heart attack on the golf course and dies. At Alan's funeral Ari speaks with John Ellis, Alan's boss. Ari tells Ellis that Alan promised Vincent Smoke Jumpers, but Ellis has other things to discuss with Ari. He wants Ari to take Alan's old job and run Warner Bros. Pictures. This would put Ari in a position to not only get Vince back on Smoke Jumpers, but to give Vince roles in any future films financed by Warner Bros. Studio. When Vince hears this information, he has a bittersweet feeling because he wants to do Smoke Jumpers, but he doesn't want to lose Ari as his agent. Ari reconsiders taking the job, but gets bad news from his fellow Hollywood friend and former flame, Dana Gordon. Vince's former agent Amanda Daniels would run the studio if Ari doesn't take the job. Ari and Vince do not have a good relationship with Amanda after she fired him as her client.

Ari goes to Amanda's office to try and bury the hatchet with Amanda. Ari offers to turn down the job if she puts Vince in Smoke Jumpers. Amanda calls Ari's bluff thinking that he is going to turn down the job anyway. This makes Ari extremely angry, and he storms out of Amanda's office to go meet with John Ellis. Vince goes to meet with Ari under the assumption that Ari had taken the position at the studio. However, to everyone's surprise Ari turned down the job. He informs Vince and Eric that he recommended his friend Dana Gordon, and she was given the job as studio head instead of Amanda. During Vince's meeting with Ari, Dana calls to thank Ari for the recommendation. On speakerphone, Dana assures Vincent that he is in Smoke Jumpers for his full quote. Ari is still Vince's agent, Eric's best friend's career is back on track, Vince is no longer in danger of going bankrupt, and is no longer in danger of ending his movie career on a box office bomb.

Unfortunately, Vince has heated confrontations with the director of Smoke Jumpers. The director fires Vince from the set of the movie. This leads to an altercation between the director and Dana, Ari, Vince, E, and John Ellis. John Ellis makes an executive decision to drop the project and Vince, E, Turtle, and Drama head back to Queens.

Back on top
Vince is offered a lead role (Nick Carraway) in Martin Scorsese's adaptation/update of The Great Gatsby set in the 1980s, courtesy of Gus Van Sant's liking of Vince's Smoke Jumpers footage. After the massive success of Gatsby, Vince is set to star in the upcoming biopic about Enzo Ferrari directed by Frank Darabont. After production of the Ferrari movie was delayed, Vince spends most of his time relaxing. During this period of delayed production on Ferrari, Vince is paid $4,000,000 to provide the voice of a dog in an animated movie (although the actual title and success of the movie is never revealed). One night he awoke and heard noises and came to the conclusion that the house had been broken into, so Ari recommended a high-security connection that he had to hopefully track down the stalker, but it turned out to be sorority girls who had stolen Turtle's boxers because he was Jamie-Lynn Sigler's boyfriend. Vince then traveled to Italy with Johnny Drama and Turtle to begin the Ferrari picture, while Eric stayed in LA with his new fiancée Sloan McQuewick.

Downward spiral
At the beginning of Season 7, as he films an action movie with Nick Cassavetes, Vince is asked to do a dangerous driving stunt in which he is almost killed. This sparks a change in Vince's attitude, but not one for the better. He begins to date porn star Sasha Grey. Vince shows up to an important meeting regarding a new superhero movie, drunk. To make matters worse, Vince arrives to the next meeting high on cocaine. Sasha is offered to do another porn film, and while Vince is reluctant, agrees to let her do the film. Starting in the later episodes, Vince appears increasingly agitated and high strung, hinting at cocaine addiction, which is essentially confirmed when Lloyd discovers a large amount of cocaine at Vince's house. On the season finale, Vince breaks up with Sasha, leaves his house for a room at the Roosevelt hotel, begins offending female partygoers and gets into a fight with Eminem at the opening party for his album Recovery. At the end of the episode, he is in the hospital after getting beaten severely, only for a police officer to find his secret stash of cocaine, which he brought to the Roosevelt.

Personal rebound
At the beginning of Season 8, Vince undergoes court-ordered rehab for 90 days and emerges victorious. Having gotten his confidence back, he focuses on his friendships again. The group goes to great lengths to prevent Vince from relapsing, such as disposing of alcohol or drugs around the house. Vince concocts an idea to make a movie involving the plight of a buried miner, intending to get Drama cast in the role. He ends up writing a 20-page treatment, that surprises Ari and Dana Gordon, who can help get it made. Vince also runs into veteran film producer Carl Ertz at the same rehab center. Ertz had screwed Vince out of a deal and tries to get him to make another one before relapsing. Ertz later commits suicide when Vince and Turtle try to come to his rescue. A small media storm ensues just as Vince is about to undergo mandatory drug testing. He soon confesses to E that he had a couple puffs of marijuana and fears that it will jeopardize his test. The group tries to come to his rescue until Vince talks to Billy Walsh, who gets him a penile implant with a clean urine sample, and the ploy works. Vince also tries to help Turtle as he tries to help a New York friend expand his restaurant business to the west coast. Turtle initially refuses his help, but Vince later reveals that he didn't sell his stock out of the tequila company that Turtle helped launch. Although Turtle sold his stock, Vince bought his share to prevent Turtle from making such a mistake, making Turtle a millionaire. Vince later has an interview with a Vanity Fair reporter named Sophia, who writes an article that he doesn't quite agree with. Vince goes to great lengths to prove to her that he's reformed, even producing a video with women he's slept with, to highlight the gentleman that he is. He succeeds in courting her and spends an unforgettable 24 hours with her, before getting engaged to her, with the ceremony taking place in Paris. The group attends, except for E, with whom Vince later smooth things over.

Achieving ultimate success
In the 2015 film, Vince and Sophia separate after nine days of marriage, realizing that the relationship wouldn't work out. Though slightly depressed about the separation, Vince decides to make his directorial debut with the film Hyde after Ari manages to become a studio-head and secure him the leading role, which he agreed to only if he could direct. He goes over budget by $15 million and requests an additional $10 million, which Ari tries to secure. During this time, Vince begins dating Emily Ratajkowski, which turns out to be what is causing trouble for extra funding as the son of the main producer of the movie has an infatuation with and is preventing further production. Ari resolves the situation once he brings this information out to the other heads of the studio, but it costs Ari his job in order to secure the $10 million for Vince to finish the movie. The film goes on to make over $450 million in worldwide sales, earning critical acclaim and Vince's older brother, Johnny Drama, a Golden Globe Award. Now that Vince has risen to the top and having established himself as an actor and as a director, he no longer has to worry about proving himself to get by. By the end of the film, Vince attends Lloyd's wedding with his friends and Ari. While talking with Billy Walsh, an idea is presented that they should make a movie or a series about their lives and journey to success, despite Ari's commenting that it was a bad idea.

Inspiration
Entourage executive producer Mark Wahlberg named the character after legendary Hollywood acting teacher Vincent Chase, with whom Wahlberg became friends while working on the 1997 Bill Paxton film Traveller. However, the character of Vincent Chase is a Marty Stu based on Mark Wahlberg himself. Wahlberg has achieved Hollywood success similar to the fictional success of Vincent.. Walt Hickey of FiveThirtyEight has argued that the career of Vincent Chase most closely matches that of Tobey Maguire. Series creator Doug Ellin has also mentioned that the character of Vince has touches of Tobey Maguire in terms of storyline, Leonardo DiCaprio in terms of personality, and Wahlberg in terms of lifestyle.

Fictional filmography

Films

Television

References

External links 
 Vincent Chase Official HBO web page
 Entourage Official HBO web page

Entourage (American TV series) characters
Fictional actors
Fictional characters from Los Angeles
Fictional characters from New York City
Television characters introduced in 2004
Fictional cannabis users
Fictional cocaine users
Fictional drug addicts
American male characters in television
 Fictional Italian American people